The pterygoalar ligament extends from the lamina of the lateral pterygoid to the undersurface of the greater wing of the sphenoid bone.

See also
Pterygospinous ligament

References

Joints